Eliot Bostar (born May 5, 1987) is an American politician serving as a member of the Nebraska Legislature from the 29th district. Elected in November 2020, he assumed office on January 6, 2021.

Early life and education 
Bostar was born and raised in New York. He graduated from St. John's Northwestern Military Academy in 2005 and earned a Bachelor of Science degree from Embry–Riddle Aeronautical University in 2009.

Career 
In 2008, Bostar worked as an intern for the Port Authority of New York and New Jersey. From 2009 to 2011, he served as an advisor in the Office of the Governor of New York. He was also a field organizer for the Barack Obama 2012 presidential campaign. He has since worked as the executive director of Conservation Nebraska and Nebraska Conservation Voters. Bostar was elected to the Nebraska Legislature in November 2020 and assumed office on January 6, 2021.

References 

1987 births
Living people
Democratic Party Nebraska state senators
Embry–Riddle Aeronautical University alumni
People from Lincoln, Nebraska
Politicians from Lincoln, Nebraska
New York (state) politicians